Shanghai Hongqiao (Shanghainese: Zånhae Ghonjio Zae) is the most prominent of the main railway stations in Shanghai, China - the others being Shanghai railway station, Shanghai South railway station and Shanghai West railway station.

Shanghai Hongqiao railway station, located in Minhang District of Shanghai, is a major part of the Hongqiao Comprehensive Transportation Hub (“the Hongqiao hub”). The station is next to Terminal 2 of Shanghai Hongqiao International Airport and lines 2,  10, and 17 of Shanghai Metro.

Overview

The construction of the railway station began on July 20, 2008 with a total investment of more than
CNY 15 billion ($2.3 billion). It was opened on July 1, 2010, simultaneously with the opening of the Shanghai–Nanjing intercity railway line. The railway station takes a total area of about 1.3 million square meters and has 16 platforms, most of which are high-speed-rail configuration. The main building of the train station measures 420 meters in length, 200 meters in width, and 70 meters high (counting both underground and overground floors). 80,000 tons of steel was used to construct the train station, twice the amount of steel used to build the Beijing National Stadium (Bird nest). The train station waiting hall area is more than 10,000 square meters (107,639 square ft), and is capable of handling 10,000 passengers at the same time. The station serves 210,000 rail passengers per day.

Station service
The station primarily serves as the Shanghai terminus of several high-speed rail lines, including the Shanghai–Nanjing intercity railway, the Shanghai–Hangzhou high-speed railway (the first section of the Shanghai–Kunming high-speed railway), and the Beijing–Shanghai high-speed railway. As of 2015, all trains departing from Shanghai Hongqiao belong to the G and D classes (interprovincial high-speed services).

Non-high-speed trains from Shanghai to the North and South of China depart from either the main Shanghai railway station or the Shanghai South railway station, respectively.

Transportation

The station serves the high speed lines:
Shanghai–Nanjing intercity railway
Shanghai–Hangzhou high-speed railway
Beijing–Shanghai high-speed railway
Nantong–Shanghai railway
Shanghai–Huzhou high-speed railway (under construction)

The station will serve the Shanghai Metropolitan Area Intercity Railway lines:
Jiamin line (under construction)
Airport Link line (under construction)
Jinshan railway (proposed extension)

Local traffic
Hongqiao Railway Station of the Shanghai Metro is served by Lines 2, 10, and 17. It is also accessible by numerous bus lines and taxi.

Other aspects
A solar system of  20,000 solar panels, with a total area of 61,000 sq m, installed on the awnings of the station, has been described as "the world's largest stand alone integrated photovoltaic (BIPV) project". With the power output of 6.68 Megawatt, the system can produce 6.3 million kilowatt-hours (kwh) of electricity per year.

Station overview
The Shanghai Hongqiao railway station covers 4 floors.

Level B1

Level B1, the underground level, contains the station exit and connections to other forms of transportation.

Arrivals at all 16 train platforms exit to this level.  This level provides access to the Shanghai Metro's Hongqiao Railway Station stop, which is the western terminus of the Main Line of Line 10 and is also served by Line 2 and Line 17. The bus stop and taxi stand are also on this level, and there is an air-conditioned passage to Terminal 2 of Shanghai Hongqiao International Airport, through which it takes about 20 minutes to walk to the airport.

The underground level also provides some fast food, such as KFC, Gongfu, Dongfang Jibai, and shopping, such as Sasa.   There are three sets of Automated Ticket Machines and four sets of Ticket Windows.

Level 1
Level 1 is where all 30 tracks running through the station are located. Most travellers simply transit through here to Level 2, the departure hall. All trains running on the Jinghu High-Speed Railway, Huhang High-Speed Railway, and the Huning Intercity Rail line wait outside of this level. A few vending machines are located near the escalators.

Level 2
Level 2 contains 3 sets of ticket windows and the massive departure hall. All trains running on the Jinghu High-Speed Railway, Huning Intercity Rail, Huhang high-speed railway lines have their passengers wait in this level. There are also drink vending machines distributed throughout the level.

Level 3
There are two unconnected parts of Level 3, one above Row A, and the other above Row B. Both offer mostly convenience stores and fast food outlets.

See also

Shanghai railway station
Shanghai South railway station
Shanghai West railway station

References

Railway stations in Shanghai
Airport railway stations in China
RTKL Associates buildings
Railway stations in China  opened in 2010
Minhang District
Stations on the Shanghai–Nanjing Intercity Railway